Japalura andersoniana, Anderson's mountain lizard, is a species of lizard in the family  Agamidae. The species is native to southern Asia.

Etymology
The specific name, andersoniana, is in honor of Scottish zoologist John Anderson.

Geographic range
J. andersoniana is found in eastern India, and in the part of southwestern China formerly known as Tibet.

Description
It is brown dorsally and ventrally, and the male has a yellow dewlap.

Reproduction
J. andersoniana is oviparous.

References

Further reading
Annandale N (1905). "Contributions to Oriental Herpetology. II.—Notes on the Oriental Lizards in the Indian Museum, with a List of the Species recorded from British India and Ceylon. Part I." Journal and Proceedings of the Asiatic Society of Bengal, New Series [Series 2] 1: 81-93 + Plates I-II. (Japalura andersoniana, new species, pp. 85–86 + Plate II, figure 4).
Bhosale H, Das A, Manthey U (2013). "Neue Fundorte und Farbvariationen von Japalura andersoniana Annandale, 1905 (Sauria: Agamidae: Draconinae)". Sauria 35 (3): 55–60. (in German).
Smith MA (1935). The Fauna of British India, Including Ceylon and Burma. Reptilia and Amphibia. Vol. II.—Sauria. London: Secretary of State for India in Council. (Taylor and Francis, printers). xiii + 440 pp. + Plate I + 2 maps. (Japalura andersoniana, p. 173).

Japalura
Taxa named by Nelson Annandale
Reptiles described in 1905